Lewis and Clark Caverns State Park is a  public recreation and nature preservation area located  east of Whitehall in Jefferson County, Montana. The state park includes two visitor centers, ten miles of hiking trails, a campground, and its namesake limestone caverns. The Lewis and Clark Caverns Historic District was placed on the National Register of Historic Places in 2018.

History
The caverns may have been familiar to Native Americans since long before their discovery by Europeans, though there has been no documented evidence of human presence in the cave before the late 1800s. The Lewis and Clark Expedition camped within sight of the caverns on July 31, 1805, when they camped along Antelope Creek. In 1892, local ranchers Tom Williams and Bert (or Burt) Pannel saw steam coming from the caverns while hunting. Following the discovery, two people from Whitehall, Montana, Charles Brooke and Mexican John claimed that they had discovered the cavern in 1882. However, their claims are unsubstantiated. In 1898, Williams finally explored the caverns with some friends.

The cave was first developed for tours around 1900 by Dan A. Morrison, who called it Limespur Cave. He filed a mineral claim on the land in 1905, but the Northern Pacific Railroad disputed that claim and filed a court case against him. The railroad won the court battle and then handed the land over to the federal government. Lewis and Clark did, however, pass through portions of the modern-day park. The caverns are also notable in that much of the work done to make the cave system accessible to tourists was performed by the New Deal-era Civilian Conservation Corps.

It was disbanded as a national monument on August 24, 1937, because the National Park Service determined the caverns lacked the required national significance. Ownership of the site was transferred to the state of Montana, and on April 22, 1938, Morrison Cave was declared Montana's first state park. The site was formally dedicated in May 1941.  The park was listed on the National Register of Historic Places in 2018.

Geology 
Lewis and Clark Caverns was dissolved by slightly acidic groundwater in tilted beds of the Madison Limestone of Mississippian age. This limestone was formed by layers of calcium-rich organisms that died in a sea that was present around 325 and 365 million years ago. Reddish sandstone, known as the Amsden, laid down in the Pennsylvanian age was uplifted to current heights during the Laramide Orogeny around 70 million years ago. This uplift constructed joints in the Madison Limestone that would later become caves, such as the Lewis and Clark Caverns.  Most of the cave was probably excavated during the ice ages, a time of much greater water supply than today.

Townsend's big-eared bats 

There used to be hundreds of western big-eared bats in the caverns, but now there are only about 50 to 150 females that roost inside the caverns each year to have their pups. The males are believed to live in other caves nearby. These bats eat thousands of insects every day. Bats have opposable thumbs and are "the only mammals capable of true flight." The year 2012 was declared the "Year of the Bat" at the caverns, with a special celebration from August 7–11. Bat week in August continues annually at the park, with bat programs offered each day during that time. Bat guano was collected by the Civilian Conservation Corps during World War II and used to make TNT. There are also springtails found in the caves.

Activities and amenities 
The park is open year-round with the caverns open by guided tour only from May through September. Park activities and amenities include amphitheatre, bicycling, bird watching, camping, restrooms, camper dump station, fire rings, fishing, hiking, mountain biking, kennels, kiosk and information station, cabins, parking, photography, picnicking with tables, playgrounds, retail firewood, ice, trails, freshwater, and wildlife.

References

External links 

Lewis and Clark Caverns State Park Montana Fish, Wildlife & Parks
Lewis and Clark Caverns State Park Trail Map Montana Fish, Wildlife & Parks

Caves of Montana
Limestone caves
Show caves in the United States
State parks of Montana
Landforms of Jefferson County, Montana
Limestone formations of the United States
Geology of Montana
Civilian Conservation Corps in Montana
Former National Monuments of the United States
Protected areas of Jefferson County, Montana
Historic districts on the National Register of Historic Places in Montana
National Register of Historic Places in Jefferson County, Montana
Protected areas established in 1935
1935 establishments in Montana
Former national parks of the United States